The Moroccan Western Sahara Wall or Berm is an approximately  sand wall or berm running south to north through Western Sahara and the southwestern portion of Morocco. It separates the Moroccan-controlled areas (the Southern Provinces) on the west from the Polisario-controlled areas (Free Zone, nominally Sahrawi Arab Democratic Republic) on the east. The main function of the barriers is to exclude guerrilla fighters of the Polisario Front, who have sought Western Saharan independence since before Spain ended its colonial occupation in 1975, from the Moroccan-controlled western part of the territory.

According to maps from the United Nations Mission for the Referendum in Western Sahara (MINURSO) or the United Nations High Commissioner for Refugees (UNHCR), in some places the wall extends several kilometers into internationally recognized Mauritanian territory.

Names
The Moroccan Western Sahara Wall is also called the Western Sahara berm and the Western Sahara separation barrier.

Physical structure
The fortifications lie in uninhabited or very sparsely inhabited territory. The barrier minebelt that runs along the structure is thought to be the longest continuous minefield in the world. Military bases, artillery posts and airfields dot the Moroccan-controlled side of the wall at regular intervals, and radar masts and other electronic surveillance equipment scan the areas in front of it.

The following is one observer's description of the berm from 2001:

In all, six lines of berms have been constructed. It then runs generally northeastward, leaving Guelta Zemmur and Smara, again crossing Mauritanian territory and reaching Hamza in Moroccan-held territory, before turning east and again closely following the Algerian border as it approaches Morocco. A section extends about  into southeastern Morocco.

Significant lines of fortifications also lie deep within the Moroccan-controlled area. Their exact number and location are a source of some confusion for overseas commentators.

All major settlements in Western Sahara, the capital Laayoune, and the phosphate mine at Bou Craa lie far into the Moroccan-held side.

History

Construction 

The fortifications were progressively built by Moroccan forces starting in 1980, with help from South African, South Korean and Israeli advisors and formally ending on 16 April 1987. The wall was built in six stages, and the area behind the wall was expanded from a small area near Morocco in the north to most of the western and central part of the country gradually. The walls built were:

1st wall (August 1980 – June 1982) surrounding the "useful triangle" of El Aaiún, Smara and the phosphate mines at Bou Craa, built with the help of South African military engineers and Portuguese and French renegade mercenaries (c. ).
2nd wall (December 1983 – January 1984) surrounding Amgala (c. ).
3rd wall (April 1984 – May 1984) surrounding Jdiriya and Haouza (c. ).
4th wall (December 1984 – January 1985) surrounding Mahbes and Farciya (c. ).
5th wall (May–September 1985) surrounding Guelta Zemmur, Bir Anzarane and Dakhla, again with the help of South African and Israeli experts (c. )
6th wall (February–April 1987) surrounding Auserd, Tichla and Bir Ganduz (c. ).
7th wall (November-December 2020) from 6th wall to Mauritanian frontier (c. ).

2005 expulsion incident 

In the summer of 2005, the Moroccan Army accelerated the expulsion (begun in late 2004) of illegal immigrants detained in northern Morocco to the eastern side of the wall, into the Free Zone. The Polisario Front and the MINURSO rescued several dozen lost in the desert, who had run out of water. Others died of thirst. By October, the Polisario had received 22 immigrants in Mehaires, 46 in Tifariti and 97 in Bir Lehlu. They were from African countries (Gambia, Cameroon, Nigeria, Ghana, etc.), except a group of 48 who were from Bangladesh.

The Thousand Column demonstration
Since 2008, a demonstration called "The Thousand Column" is held annually in the desert against the barrier by international human rights activists and Sahrawi refugees. In the 2008 demonstration, more than 2,000 people (most of them Sahrawis and Spaniards, but also Algerians, Italians, and others) made a human chain demanding the demolition of the wall, the celebration of the self-determination referendum accorded by the UN and the parts in 1991, and the end of the Moroccan occupation of the territory.

During the 2009 demonstration, a teenage Sahrawi refugee named Ibrahim Hussein Leibeit lost half of his right leg in a landmine explosion. The incident happened when Leibeit and dozens of young Sahrawis crossed the line into a minefield while aiming to throw stones to the other side of the wall.

Effect 
Effectively, after the completion of the wall, Morocco has controlled the bulk of Western Sahara territory that lies to the north and west of it, calling these the kingdom's "Southern Provinces". The Polisario-founded Sahrawi Arab Democratic Republic controls the mostly uninhabited "Free Zone", which comprises all areas to the east of the barrier. Units from the United Nations mission MINURSO separate the two sides, and enforce cease-fire regulations on their troops.

External reactions and opinions
Western attention to the wall, and to the Moroccan annexation of Western Sahara in general, has been minimal, apart from Spain. In Africa, the annexation of Western Sahara by Morocco has attracted somewhat more attention. Algeria supports the Polisario Front "in its long-running desert war to oppose Moroccan control of the disputed area". The Organization of African Unity/African Union (AU) and United Nations have proposed negotiated solutions. 

The AU's stance on Western Sahara led to Morocco's exit from the organization. After a 33-year absence, Morocco rejoined on 30 January 2017, despite 9 member states voting against, but 39 supporting. Morocco was re-admitted with the understanding that Western Sahara will remain an AU member. The membership of relatively wealthy Morocco was welcomed by many members, as the AU has been criticized for being overly dependent on non-African donor funding.

Gallery

See also

Defensive wall
List of walls
Wall of Shame

References and notes

External links

Map of Western Sahara, with the location of the wall marked Produced by the United Nations, showing the deployment of the MINURSO mission as of January 2014. Map No. 3691 Rev. 72 United Nations, January 2014 (Colour), Department of Peacekeeping Operations, Cartographic Section
Landmine Monitor, LM Report 2006, Morocco
Landmine Monitor, LM Report 2006, Western Sahara 
Landmine Monitor, LM Report 2006, Algeria
Profile – Created by the United Nations MINURSO mission

Walls
Western Sahara conflict
Buildings and structures in Western Sahara
Separation barriers
Borders of Morocco
Borders of Western Sahara
Politics of Morocco
Politics of Western Sahara